1652 Hergé, provisional designation , is a stony Florian asteroid from the inner regions of the asteroid belt, approximately 9 kilometers in diameter. It was discovered on 9 August 1953, by Belgian astronomer Sylvain Arend at the Royal Observatory of Belgium in Uccle, Belgium. It was later named after Belgian cartoonist Hergé.

Orbit and classification 

Hergé is a member of the Flora family, one of the largest families of stony asteroids. It orbits the Sun in the inner main-belt at a distance of 1.9–2.6 AU once every 3 years and 5 months (1,234 days). Its orbit has an eccentricity of 0.15 and an inclination of 3° with respect to the ecliptic.

Physical characteristics 

Hergé has been characterized as a common S-type asteroid by Pan-STARRS photometric survey.

Rotation period 

Astronomer Petr Pravec obtained a rotational lightcurve of Hergé from photometric observations taken at Ondřejov Observatory in September 2014. It gave a rotation period of 16.36 hours with a brightness amplitude of 0.42 magnitude.

Diameter and albedo 

According to the survey carried out by NASA's Wide-field Infrared Survey Explorer with its subsequent NEOWISE mission, Hergé measures between 8.68 and 8.95 kilometers in diameter, and its surface has an albedo between 0.116 and 0.308. The Collaborative Asteroid Lightcurve Link assumes an albedo of 0.24 – derived from 8 Flora, the largest member and namesake of this orbital family – and calculates a diameter of 9.41 kilometers with an absolute magnitude of 12.54.

Naming 

This minor planet was named in honor of Belgian cartoonist Georges Remi, better known under his pseudonym Hergé. He is considered to be the father of the fictional Adventures of Tintin, one of the most popular European comics of the 20th century, and creator of its hero, Tintin, in 1929. The asteroid 1683 Castafiore was also named after the comic-strip character Bianca Castafiore from the series. The approved naming citation was published by the Minor Planet Center on 8 April 1982.

Notes

References

External links 
 Asteroid Lightcurve Database (LCDB), query form (info )
 Dictionary of Minor Planet Names, Google books
 Asteroids and comets rotation curves, CdR – Observatoire de Genève, Raoul Behrend
 Discovery Circumstances: Numbered Minor Planets (1)-(5000) – Minor Planet Center
 
 

001652
Discoveries by Sylvain Arend
Named minor planets
Hergé
19530809